Sihora Assembly constituency is one of the 230 Vidhan Sabha (Legislative Assembly) constituencies of Madhya Pradesh state in central India.

It is part of Jabalpur district.

See also
 Sihora

References

Assembly constituencies of Madhya Pradesh
Jabalpur district